Geghamabak is a village in the Vardenis Municipality of the Gegharkunik Province of Armenia. The village was populated by Azerbaijanis before the exodus of Azerbaijanis from Armenia after the outbreak of the Nagorno-Karabakh conflict. In 1988-1989 Armenian refugees from Azerbaijan settled in the village.

Etymology 
The village was also previously known as Ghayabagh and Quşabulaq, and was renamed to Geghamabak in 1990.

Demographics 
As of 2020, according to a media report, Geghamabak had 129 registered inhabitants, and 64 inhabitants de facto.

References

External links 
 

Populated places in Gegharkunik Province